Dahira pinratanai is a moth of the  family Sphingidae. It is known from Thailand.

References

Dahira
Moths described in 1991